Paolo Dalle Fratte (9 July 1951 – 9 May 2022) was an Italian politician. A member of Forza Italia, he served in the Chamber of Deputies from 2001 to 2006. He died in Santa Maria di Sala on 9 May 2022 at the age of 70.

References

1951 births
2022 deaths
21st-century Italian politicians
Forza Italia politicians
Deputies of Legislature XIV of Italy
Politicians from the Metropolitan City of Venice